Vasas SC is a sport society in Angyalföld, Hungary. Vasas SC may also refer to:

 Vasas SC (women's handball), a women's handball club
 Budapest Stars, an ice hockey club
 Vasas SC (men's water polo), a men's water polo club
 Vasas SC (fencing), a fencing club